At the 2010 Asian Games in the men's doubles tennis event, Mahesh Bhupathi and Leander Paes did not defend the title as they were both involved in the season-ending Tour Finals.
In the final, Somdev Devvarman and Sanam Singh defeated Gong Maoxin and Li Zhe 6–3, 6–7(4), [10–8].

Tie-breaks were used for the first two sets of each match, which was the best of three sets. If the score was tied at one set all, a 'super tie-break' (the first pairing to win at least 10 points by a margin of two points) would be used.

Schedule
All times are China Standard Time (UTC+08:00)

Results
Legend
WO — Won by walkover

Final

Top half

Bottom half

References
Draw

Men's doubles